Rhythm, Love and Mischief (Ritmo, amor y picardía) is an 1955 Argentine musical (tango) comedy film directed by Enrique Carreras and written by Manuel Barberá. It stars Alberto Castillo, Amelita Vargas, Alfredo Barbieri and Francisco Álvarez and was released on 2 March 1958.

Plot
A cantankerous father changes his character when a young man who marries one of his daughters revolutionises the household.

Cast
  Alberto Castillo as Raúl Sierra
  Amelita Vargas as Margarita 
  Alfredo Barbieri as Javier 
  Francisco Álvarez as Don Fermín Romero
  María Luisa Santés as Doña Mercedes
  Adrianita as Martha
  Pola Neuman as Ramona
  Lilian Valmar as Elvira
  Sandra Verani as Paca
  Héctor Armendáriz as Bernardo

Reception 
La Nación''' considered the film (translated from Spanish) "very funny, of spontaneous grace in dialogue and action.". Raúl Manrupe and María Alejandra Portela in their book Un diccionario de films argentinos (1930–1995)'' wrote: "Comedy quite agile with good work by Alberto Castillo."

References

External links
 

1955 films
1950s Argentine films
1950s Spanish-language films
Argentine black-and-white films
Films directed by Enrique Carreras
Tango films
1955 musical comedy films
Argentine musical comedy films